No. 48 Squadron ( or ), renamed No. 48 Bomber Squadron (Finnish: Pommituslentolaivue 48 or PLe.Lv.48 on 14 February 1944) was a bomber squadron of the Finnish Air Force during World War II. The squadron was part of Flying Regiment 4.

Organization

Continuation War
1st Flight (1. Lentue)
2nd Flight (2. Lentue)
3rd Flight (3. Lentue)
Ambulance Flight (Sairaankuljetuslentue)
Photography Flight or Flight Ahtiainen (Valokuvauslentue or Lentue Ahtiainen)
Separate Photography Flight (Erillinen valokuvauslentue or Er.Valok.Ltue.)

The equipment consisted of 19 Bristol Blenheim Mk.Is, Bristol Blenheim Mk.IVs, 4 Ilyushin DB-3Ms, Ilyushin Il-4s, 4 Petlyakov Pe-2s, 1 Dornier Do 17Z, 1 Douglas DC-2, and 3 Junkers aircraft.

External links

Lentolaivue 48

48